San Marcos is a town in Northern Peru, capital of San Marcos province in the region of Cajamarca.
San Marcos has volleyball facilities located at Doña Fide's.

References

Populated places in the Cajamarca Region